Fulke may refer to:
Fulke d'Aunou, also written Fulco and Foulques (1004-1080?), Baron of Aunou-le-Faucon, Normandy. Second cousin of William of Normandy and one of 30 knights named as present with William at the Battle of Hastings (1066), he was awarded lands around High Littleton, Somerset, England
Fulke Lovell (or Fulk Lovel) was a medieval Bishop of London elect
Fulke Greville, 1st Baron Brooke (1554–1628), Elizabethan poet, dramatist, and statesman
Fulke Greville (1717–1806) (1717–1806),  the youngest son of Henry Somerset, 1st Duke of Beaufort
Fulke Greville-Nugent, 1st Baron Greville (1821–1883), Irish politician
Fulke Johnson Houghton (b. 1940), British racehorse trainer
Fulke Walwyn (1910–1991), British jockey and racehorse trainer
Pierre Fulke (born 1971), Swedish golfer who played on the European Tour
Robert Fulke Greville (1751–1824), British Member of Parliament (MP) and courtier
Robert Fulke Greville (landowner) (1800–1867), politician, soldier and landowner
William Fulke (1538–1589), English Puritan divine